Kuripitone "Tony" Tatupu is a former professional rugby league footballer. Tatupu is the uncle of the rugby league footballer; Matthew Wright.

Playing career
Tatupu first played for the Mt Albert Lions in the Auckland competition before joining the North Harbour Sea Eagles for the 1994 Lion Red Cup season. Between 1991 and 1993 he played 12 games for Auckland. From there he joined the Auckland Warriors for their inaugural season in the Australian Rugby League competition. Along with Nigel Vagana he joined the Warrington Wolves in the Super League competition in 1997 before returning to the Warriors for another two seasons.

In 2000 he returned to England to finish his career at the Wakefield Trinity Wildcats. He stayed with the club during a time of financial turbulence mid-way through the 2000 season which saw all players aged over 24 released and then re-signed on limited wages.

Representative career
Tatupu represented Samoa at two World Cups, and two Pacific Cups. He was named in the 1992 Pacific Cups team of the tournament.

Later years
He now serves as a New Zealand Police officer and represented the New Zealand Police at the inaugural Police World Cup.

Tatupu's son Shem has been signed by Australian Football League (AFL) club Hawthorn as an international rookie.

References

1969 births
Living people
Auckland rugby league team players
Expatriate rugby league players in England
Mount Albert Lions players
New Zealand expatriate rugby league players
New Zealand expatriate sportspeople in England
New Zealand police officers
New Zealand national rugby league team players
New Zealand rugby league players
New Zealand Warriors players
New Zealand sportspeople of Samoan descent
North Harbour rugby league team players
Rugby league second-rows
Rugby league centres
Samoa national rugby league team players
Wakefield Trinity players
Warrington Wolves players